Castanea is a census-designated place (CDP) in Castanea Township, Clinton County, Pennsylvania, United States. The population was 1,125 at the 2010 census.

Geography
Castanea is located in southeastern Clinton County at  (41.122882, -77.432578). It occupies most of the western side of Castanea Township. The community occupies an area bordered by Bald Eagle Creek to the north and Bald Eagle Mountain to the south. Jarrett Avenue crosses Bald Eagle Creek, connecting the center of town with U.S. Route 220 and the city of Lock Haven to the north.

Demographics

As of the census of 2000, there were 1,189 people, 497 households, and 357 families residing in the CDP, figures representing about 96% of the population of the Township.  There are only 44 people, 19 households, and 15 families located outside of the CDP but within the township.

The population density was 887.4 people per square mile (342.6/km). There were 512 housing units at an average density of 382.1/sq mi (147.5/km). The racial makeup of the CDP was 98.74% White, 0.67% Asian, 0.08% African American, 0.17% from other races, and 0.34% from two or more races. Hispanic or Latino of any race were 0.25% of the population.

There were 497 households, out of which 26.2% had children under the age of 18 living with them, 61.8% were married couples living together, 6.6% had a female householder with no husband present, and 28.0% were non-families. 21.5% of all households were made up of individuals, and 9.9% had someone living alone who was 65 years of age or older. The average household size was 2.39 and the average family size was 2.77.

In the CDP, the population was spread out, with 20.2% under the age of 18, 8.0% from 18 to 24, 28.8% from 25 to 44, 25.5% from 45 to 64, and 17.5% who were 65 years of age or older. The median age was 41 years. For every 100 females, there were 93.3 males. For every 100 females age 18 and over, there were 90.9 males.

The median income for a household in the CDP was $33,519, and the median income for a family was $35,966. Males had a median income of $28,864 versus $20,529 for females. The per capita income for the CDP was $15,133. About 6.7% of families and 9.1% of the population were below the poverty line, including 7.7% of those under age 18 and 6.4% of those age 65 or over.

References

Census-designated places in Clinton County, Pennsylvania
Census-designated places in Pennsylvania